The 2018 Houston Dash season is the team's fifth season as an American professional women's soccer team in the National Women's Soccer League. Before the start of the 2018 season Vera Pauw was appointed as head coach.

Team information

Rosters 
Players and squad numbers last updated on June 20, 2018.Note: Flags indicate national team as has been defined under FIFA eligibility rules. Players may hold more than one non-FIFA nationality.

Competitions

NWSL

League standings

Results by round

Matches

Pre-season and friendlies

Regular season

Statistics

Appearances

Honors and awards

NWSL Yearly Awards

NWSL Team of the Year

NWSL Monthly Awards

NWSL Player of the Month

NWSL Team of the Month

NWSL Weekly Awards

NWSL Player of the Week

NWSL Save of the Week

NWSL Goal of the Week

Player transactions

2018 NWSL College Draft

 Source: National Women's Soccer League

In

Out

Notes

References 

Houston Dash seasons
Houston Dash
Houston Dash
Houston Dash